Deepak Lohar is an actor who mostly acts in Nagpuri and Hindi films. He graduated from the National School of Drama. He is known for the films Jharkhand Kar Chhaila, Chamku, Ilaka Kishoreganj and Namaha Shivaya Shantaya.

Filmography

Awards

References

External links

Indian male film actors
Year of birth missing (living people)
Living people
Nagpuria people